Esperia oliviella is a species of gelechioid moth.

Taxonomy
In its superfamily, this species is placed in the genus Esperia within the subfamily Oecophorinae of the concealer moth family (Oecophoridae). Some authors, in particular those that follow a "splitting" approach to gelechioidea systematics and taxonomy, recognize Dasycera as an independent genus. The present species is thus not infrequently listed as Dasycera oliviella; indeed, it is (under its junior synonym Tinea aemulella) the type species of Dasycera.

Distribution and habitat
This species is present in most of Europe (Austria, Belgium, Bosnia and Herzegovina, British Islands, Bulgaria, Croatia, Czech Republic, France, Italy, Germany, Greece, Hungary, Poland, Portugal, Romania, Slovakia, Slovenia, Russia, Spain, Switzerland and the Netherlands) and the Near East.  It inhabits old-growth woodland. Though not generally uncommon, at the periphery of its range it is a rare sight. For example, in the UK its only significant populations are in the south and southeast of England, the regions closest to the European continent.

Description
At a casual glance, this species resembles its widespread relative E. sulphurella, being largely black, with a white band half-way across the thick antennae and yellowish forewing markings. Of these, the band across the midwing is not interrupted however, and the proximal lengthwise mark is a shorter triangle rather than a long streak. After eclosion and some time thereafter, E. oliviella also has a pronounced purplish sheen which is far less conspicuous in E. sulphurella even if freshly eclosed. Head and hind wings are black, whitish at the base of the upper edge. Antennae are black, with a white part before the tip.

Biology
Adults are on the wing around June and July (depending on locality) and are diurnal, though they avoid the hot period around noon. The caterpillars live under the bark of various deciduous and pine trees and feed on rotting wood, especially of hazels (Corylus), blackthorn (Prunus spinosa), oaks (Quercus), Picea, Pinus, Pyrus, Robinia, Ulmus, etc. They hibernate and complete development in spring.

Bibliography
Bradley, J.D.Checklist of Lepidoptera Recorded from The British Isles, Second Edition (Revised) (2000)
Emmet, A.M. (Ed.)A Field Guide to the Smaller British Lepidoptera (1988)
Emmet, A.M., Langmaid, J.R. (Eds.)The Moths and Butterflies of Great Britain and Ireland, Volume 4 (Part 1) (2002)

References

External links
 Lepiforum 

Oecophorinae
Moths described in 1794
Moths of Asia
Moths of Europe
Taxa named by Johan Christian Fabricius